The Warlock of Firetop Mountain refers to a franchise created by Steve Jackson and Ian Livingstone:

The Warlock of Firetop Mountain, a Fighting Fantasy gamebook published in 1982
The Warlock of Firetop Mountain (board game), a 1986 board game published by Games Workshop based on the book
The Warlock of Firetop Mountain (video game), a 1984 ZX Spectrum video game based on the book
Fighting Fantasy: The Warlock of Firetop Mountain, a 2009 Nintendo DS video game based on the book